Gurukul Public School is a private secondary school run by the Shri Ram Sharnam Educational Trust in Khair, India. It is a co-educational day-cum-boarding school affiliated to the Central Board of Secondary Education (CBSE).

Facilities
The school has separate well-equipped science laboratories.

Academics
The school offers education up to the 12th grade in the streams of science and commerce.

Sports and co-curricular activities
The School has facility to support an array of sports activities like cricket, table tennis, badminton, volleyball.

See also
 Central Board of Secondary Education
 List of schools in Aligarh

References

External links
 

High schools and secondary schools in Uttar Pradesh
Private schools in Uttar Pradesh
Boarding schools in Uttar Pradesh
Education in Aligarh district
Educational institutions established in 2012
2012 establishments in Uttar Pradesh